Statistics of Úrvalsdeild in the 1982 season.

Overview
It was contested by 10 teams, and Víkingur won the championship. Víkingur's Heimir Karlsson and ÍBV's Sigurlás Þorleifsson were the joint top scorers with 10 goals.

League standings

Results
Each team played every opponent once home and away for a total of 18 matches.

References

Úrvalsdeild karla (football) seasons
Iceland
Iceland
1